Nikita Rawal (born 16 July 1990) is an Indian dancer and actress.

Born and brought up in Mumbai, Maharashtra, she is known as an organizer and a performer in Bollywood and South Indian movies. Rawal has worked  movies such as Black & White with Anil Kapoor and Shefali Shah, Mr Hot Mr Kool and The Hero – Abhimanyu,

Ammaa Ki Boli, Garam Masala, starring Akshay Kumar and John Abhraham, Cute Kamina etc. She has also worked in Tollywood since 2012, and has received 8 awards. She has undertaken a government project depicting social issues, produced by Innocent Virus Films on NDTV. The video is based on spreading awareness about making the country drug free. In her upcoming film Roti Kapda and Romance, she plays the lead role alongside Arshad Warsi and Chunky Pandey.

Filmography

References

External links 
 
 

Indian film actresses
Living people
1990 births
Actresses from Mumbai
21st-century Indian actresses
Actresses in Tamil cinema
Actresses in Telugu cinema
Actresses in Hindi cinema